The Shawville Pontiacs are a Junior "B" team based out of Shawville, Quebec.  They play out of the Eastern Ontario Junior Hockey League.

History
At the conclusion of the 2014-15 season, the league announced it was re-organizing to be more of dedicated developmental league to the Central Canada Hockey League and renamed the league Central Canada Hockey League Tier 2.  Initially,  the league was to downsize to twelve teams (one feeder club for each Tier 1 team), however it reduced to 16 teams, eliminating 6 of the current franchises, including the Akwesasne Wolves, Morrisburg Lions, Almonte Thunder, Gananoque Islanders, Gatineau Mustangs and Shawville Pontiacs.

On May 24, 2015, team President officially declared the team was folding.

Season-by-Season results

External links
Pontiacs Webpage
EOJHL Webpage

Eastern Ontario Junior Hockey League teams
Ice hockey teams in Quebec
Ice hockey clubs established in 1986
1986 establishments in Quebec